Maria Alexandrovna Ulyanova (née Blank;  – ) was the mother of Vladimir Lenin, the Bolshevik revolutionary leader and founder of the Soviet Union. 

She was born in Saint Petersburg as Maria Alexandrovna Blank, one of six children. Her father, Alexandr Dmitrievich Blank,  was a well-to-do physician. Some researchers argue that he was a Jewish convert to Orthodox Christianity, while others say he was actually the descendant of German colonists invited to Russia by Catherine the Great. There is evidence that he was a Jewish convert to Christianity and that he was born as Srul Moshevich Blank also spelled Israil Moiseevich Blank. However, some historians argue this was another man by a similar name. Her mother, Anna Ivanovna Groschopf, was the daughter of a German father, Johann Groschopf, and a Swedish Lutheran mother, Anna Östedt. 

In 1838, Ulyanova's mother died and her father turned to his sister-in-law, Ekaterina von Essen, to help raise the children. Together they bought a country estate near Kazan and moved the family there.

Ulyanova was educated at home, studying German, French and English as well as Russian and Western literature. In 1863, she took an external degree and became an elementary school teacher. However, she would go on to dedicate most of her life to raising her children. 

After marrying Ilya Nikolayevich Ulyanov, an upwardly mobile teacher of mathematics and physics, the couple lived in moderate prosperity in Penza. Later, they moved to Nizhny Novgorod and then Simbirsk, where Ulyanov took up a prestigious position as an inspector of primary schools.

Ulyanova displayed a courage and firmness in the face of tragedies and misfortunes that would haunt her family during her lifetime, namely: the deaths of her infant children, Olga and Nikolai, in 1869 and 1873, respectively; the death of her husband in 1886; the execution of her son, Aleksandr, in 1887; the death of her daughter, Olga, in 1891; and the multiple arrests and exiles of the rest of her children – Vladimir, Anna, Dmitry and Maria.

She went abroad twice to meet with Vladimir Lenin (to France in the summer of 1902 and Stockholm in the fall of 1910).

Family
She was married to Ilya Ulyanov from 1863 until his death in 1886. They had eight children, two of whom died as infants.
 Anna (1864 – 1935)
 Aleksandr (1866 – 1887)
 Olga (1868 – 1869)
 Vladimir (1870 – 1924)
 Olga (1871 – 1891)
 Nikolai (1873 – 1873)
 Dmitri (1874 – 1943)
 Maria (1878 – 1937)

References

External links

1835 births
1916 deaths
People from Kazan
People from Penza
People from the Russian Empire of Swedish descent
People from the Russian Empire of German descent
Family of Vladimir Lenin